The 12953 / 12954 August Kranti Tejas Rajdhani  is a train that connects  to  in India. It is named after the August Kranti Maidan formerly known as the Gowalia Tank Maidan from where the Quit India Movement was launched in August 1942. On 12 December 2021, August Kranti Rajdhani Express commenced its run with new Tejas rake from Mumbai Central from onwards.

Route & Halts

Traction
Both trains are hauled by a Vadodara Loco Shed based WAP-7 locomotive on its entire journey.

Speed
The maximum permissible speed of the train is up to 130 kmph except some parts.
	
The maximum permissible speed of the train or the route is 120 kmph between H. Nizamuddin and Tuglakabad, a part of New Delhi (NDLS) and Tuglakabad (TKD) route where RDSO has been requested to corroborate the track quality fit for raising sectional speed to 130 kmph. The maximum permissible speed of the train is 130 kmph in Tuglakabad (TKD) –  Palwal (PWL) – Mathura (MTJ) route where it is slower than the fastest train of the route having speed of 160 kmph. The maximum permissible speed of the train or the route: 130 kmph in Mathura  (MTJ) – Nagda (NAD) – Ratlam (RTM) route, 100 kmph between Ratlam (RTM) and LIMKHEDA but Railway is trying to raise up to 110 kmph in its part between Limkheda and Megnagar and 130 kmph not feasible on Ghat (Hill) section. The maximum permissible speed of the train or the route: 110 kmph between LIMKHEDA and GODHRA (130 kmph not feasible on Ghat section), 130 kmph between GODHRA and VIRAR, 110 kmph in only 26 km long VIRAR – BORIVALI route, 100 kmph in only 30 km long BORIVALI – Mumbai Central (MMCT, formerly BCT) route. 
	
Railway Board has approved the speed policy which envisages operation of passenger trains at 160 kmph on Delhi–Mumbai route but it is still unclear what will its impact on this train in future like increasing of speed but not up to 160 kmph or up to 160 kmph.

References

External links
 12953/August Kranti Rajdhani Express India Rail Info
 

Delhi–Mumbai trains
Railway services introduced in 1992
Rajdhani Express trains
Rail transport in Madhya Pradesh
Rail transport in Gujarat
Rail transport in Rajasthan
Rail transport in Maharashtra
Rail transport in Uttar Pradesh
Rail transport in Haryana
Rail transport in Delhi